Spyros Gogolos (Greek: Σπύρος Γόγολος, born 11 August 1978) is a retired Greek footballer, who played as a defender.

Club career

He was born on 11 August 1978 in Kerkyra. His family origins are from Paramythia in Thesprotia, Epirus.

He started playing football for Kerkyra. He joined the first team in 1995, at a time when the latter was competing in the Fourth Division, without getting to play in that season. At the end of the season Kerkyra was promoted. Gogolos played 21 Third Division and 2 Cup games during the 1996–97 season and became known as a player.

In 1997, he moved to Kallithea, then a Second Division team. In his two and a half seasons he would be in the starting lineup in most games. Next came two season with Panionios in the First Division.

In January 2002, Gogolos returned to Kallithea and helped the team get promoted to the First Division. He continued playing there until 2004, when he joined Aris of Thessaloniki.

During the 2007–08 season with Aris, Gogolos was not fielded by his coach for a single league match. He thus reached consensus with the team for the termination of his contract mid-season Shortly after, Gogolos signed up for PAS Giannena. His last game with Aris on 29 November 2007 was vs the Wanderers in Bolton, for the UEFA Cup, as a late substitution, where he bore some of the responsibility for the equaliser by Giannakopoulos. Still, upon his departure after four years with Aris, he was given credit by the press for his commitment, for the helping the team rebound from the Second Division and, finally, for his dignified farewell statement.

References

External links

1978 births
Living people
Greek footballers
A.O. Kerkyra players
Kallithea F.C. players
Panionios F.C. players
Aris Thessaloniki F.C. players
PAS Giannina F.C. players
Ermis Aradippou FC players
Anagennisi Deryneia FC players
Olympiacos Volos F.C. players
PAS Lamia 1964 players
Super League Greece players
Cypriot First Division players
Association football defenders
Sportspeople from Corfu